Vlčí jáma may refer to:

 Vlčí jáma (novel), a 1938 Czech psychological novel, written by Jarmila Glazarová
 Vlčí jáma (film), a 1957 Czech drama film